The 2002–03 North West Counties Football League season was the 21st in the history of the North West Counties Football League, a football competition in England. Teams were divided into two divisions: Division One and Division Two.

Division One 

Division One featured two new teams, promoted as runners-up of Division Two:

 Alsager Town
 Squires Gate

League table

Division Two 

Division Two featured two new teams, relegated from Division One:

 Maine Road
 Great Harwood Town

League table

References

 http://www.tonykempster.co.uk/archive02-03/nwc1.htm
 http://www.tonykempster.co.uk/archive02-03/nwc2.htm

External links 
 NWCFL Official Site

North West Counties Football League seasons
8